The Hamilton Joes are a collegiate summer baseball team that competes in the Great Lakes Summer Collegiate League (GLSCL), one of eight leagues formed under the National Alliance of College Summer Baseball (NACSB). The team plays at Hamilton's Foundation Field.

History 
The Hamilton Joes were founded in 2008 as a non-profit organization by their then President/GM, Hamilton native Mike Brennan, along with their manager/head coach, Darrel Grissom. The team's namesake is Joe Nuxhall, a Hamilton native and Cincinnati Reds pitcher who is a member of the team's hall of fame. The team played its first season in the  Great Lakes League in 2009.

In March 2011, Brennan resigned from his positions and named assistant general manager Joshua Manley as his successor. The following year, Manley carried his coaching duties over from the collegiate spring season to the collegiate summer season.  Manley took over as vice president and general manager of the team while Darrel Grissom was promoted to president and remained Director of Baseball Operations. Manley left the team before the 2014 season.
Following Manley’s departure, John Dotson served as assistant GM from 2015-2016. In August 2016, Ryan Finnerty was promoted to assistant GM and still serves in that role today.

Playoff history 
In only their second season in operation and their first playoff appearance, the Joes won the league championship. The Joes entered the playoffs as the 2 seed, and defeated the Southern Ohio Copperheads in two games (of a best-of-three series). In the Championship Series, the Joes faced the number 1 seeded Licking County Settlers and also defeated them in two games, capturing the franchise's first championship. In 2015, they again advanced to the championship round but lost to the Lima Locos, though they would defeat Lima the following year for another championship.

Season records 
Records not available before 2011.

References

External links 
Hamilton Joes
Hamilton Joes 2009-2010 Photo Gallery

Amateur baseball teams in Ohio
Baseball teams established in 2009
2009 establishments in Ohio
Hamilton, Ohio